Li Po is a crater on Mercury. It has a diameter of 120 kilometers. Its name was adopted by the International Astronomical Union (IAU) in 1976. Li Po is named for the Chinese poet Li Bai, who lived from 701 to 762.

References

Impact craters on Mercury
Li Bai